The Toll Group is an Australian-based subsidiary of Japan Post Holdings with operations in transportation, warehousing and logistics in road, rail, sea and air. It has two divisions; Global Forwarding, Global Logistics.

History

In 1888, Albert Toll began a horse-and-cart coal hauling business in Newcastle. The Toll business was purchased by National Minerals in 1959. In 1962 it was purchased by mining conglomerate Peko-Wallsend. Under Peko-Wallsend, which used Toll for all its transport activities, Toll developed into a national carrier. In 1969 it merged with HH Chadwick to form Toll-Chadwick, and its new owners sought to integrate its businesses and expand into containerised shipping.

After being rebranded Toll Transport in 1985, the next year it was sold in a management buyout to Paul Little and Peter Rowsthorn with five depots and 125 trucks. In 1989 it was rebranded Toll Express after entering the interstate market and moved its headquarters from Newcastle to Melbourne. In 1991 it began operating in Tasmania with the purchase of Tasmania Express. In October 1993, it was listed on the Australian Securities Exchange.
 
In 1996, Toll Express purchased Brambles Transport Industries, followed by eight TNT transport and logistics businesses in 1997. In 1998 it acquired Ipec from Mayne Nickless.

In 2001, Toll took over its competitor Finemores and the road transport interests of Wesfarmers taking its fleet to over 6,000 vehicles.

In 2002, Toll purchased BHP's stevedoring business, took a 50% share in Pacific National that took over the FreightCorp and National Rail Corporation businesses, acquired the Brambles Shipping business, including the ships Tasmanian Achiever and Victorian Reliance and the Mayne Express business.

In 2003, an 84% share in Tranz Rail was purchased and became Toll NZ. This was increased in 2007 to 100%. In 2008 the New Zealand rail and ferry operations were sold to KiwiRail.

In 2009, Toll took a 55% stake in the Cambodian business Toll Royal Railway, a joint venture with Kith Meng's Royal Group to takeover over the dilapidated metre-gauge network in Cambodia. This was sold in December 2014.

In July 2006 Toll acquired Patrick Corporation in a hostile takeover. In 2007 Patrick and Pacific National, were spun-off into a stand-alone listed company, Asciano. In 2007, Toll sold a 50% share in Toll Air Services, its aircraft ground handling business to dnata who purchased the remainder of the business in 2017. In 2012, Toll acquired a one-third shareholding in Bowmans Rail.

In 2015 Japan Post Holdings made a takeover offer for the Toll Group that was accepted. In 2019, the Bass Strait ships Tasmanian Achiever and Victorian Reliance were replaced by the ''Tasmanian Achiever II and the Victorian Reliance II.

In April 2021, Japan Post Holdings agreed to sell the Global Express division of Toll Holdings for 7.8 million Australian dollars. The offer was accepted despite the fact that Toll Global Express had lost 67.4 billion yen — or roughly $624 million — for the fiscal year which ended in March 2021.

Divisions

IPEC 

The Interstate Parcel Express Company (IPEC) was established in January 1954 and operated two Peugeot utility vehicles on express parcel services from Adelaide to Melbourne. By 1968 it was operating in all Australian capital cities.

In 1963, IPEC commenced operating interstate air freight services from Melbourne to Launceston service commencing with Douglas DC-3s chartered from Brain & Brown operating three services per night.

In 1966 IPEC began operating another interstate air freight service between Brisbane and Cowra that contravened the Two Airlines Policy using a chartered Air Express Holdings Bristol Freighter, where it connected with trucks to Melbourne. IPEC had already purchased a Douglas DC-4 in England, however the Federal Government would not allow it into Australia. The Cowra service ceased in 1967.

In 1977 IPEC imported two Argosys followed by a further two in 1978. In 1979, IPEC commenced operating services between Melbourne, Sydney and Brisbane using chartered East-West Airlines Fokker F27 Friendships. A Douglas DC-9 was purchased in 1982.

In October 1979, IPEC purchased British freight company Sayer Transport Group. In December 1980 it purchased Skypack International with operations in 26 countries. IPEC owned the Angus & Robertson publishing business until selling it to News Corporation in May 1981. In 1983 Skypack International was sold to Thomas Nationwide Transport.

In 1983 Mayne Nickless purchased a 50% shareholding. In 1998 IPEC was purchased by Toll and rebranded Toll IPEC.

In July 2007, Toll Holdings Limited acquired Victorian Express Pty Ltd which provided intrastate express freight services within Victoria.

Global Express

Toll Global Express was a logistics and transportation division of the group. In 2012 it had plans to extend its compressed natural gas-powered fleet to more than 70 trucks. In 2014 it announced a $150-million, 71,000-square-metre, parcel-sorting centre near Melbourne Airport, to be built in partnership with Australia Pacific Airports.

Toll agreed to sell the division to Allegro Funds in April 2021. In 2022 it was rebranded Team Global Express.

Global Forwarding

Toll Global Forwarding (TGF)  provides international freight forwarding and supply chain management services that range from complex supply chain services through to port-to-port freight forwarding movements.

It has eight business units: Americas; Australia and New Zealand; Greater China; South Africa and Zambia; United Kingdom and Ireland; Mainland Europe; Middle East and Indian Sub Continent; and South East Asia. Headquartered in Hong Kong, it has a global network of over 70 offices in over 30 countries throughout Asia, Europe, North America, Africa, Australia, New Zealand and the Middle East.

In the 2014 financial year Toll Global Forwarding transacted an ocean freight volume of 542,000 TEUs and an air freight volume 114,000 tonnes.

TGF is the largest freight forwarder (in total TEU volume) to Asia. Toll has a diverse fleet that can move freight in a range of sizes and configurations. Toll has a specialised fleet to transport perishable freight.

Geographic Reach
In 2012 TGF reported they had more than 70 offices in 25 countries and about 5,500 employees.

The division's global reach is to more than 220 countries and territories. TGF is active in six major trade lanes: Asia and Australia and New Zealand; Asia and the USA; Asia and Europe; Asia and the UK; Asia and South Africa; and Intra Asia. In 2014 TGF reported they are moving forward from acquisition to consolidation, and restructure to re-engineering and growth. During the 2014 financial year, TGF reduced costs and improved productivity.

In 2008 Toll acquired BALtrans Logistics.

In 2009 Toll acquired Express Logistics Group (ELG), one of New Zealand's largest freight forwarding companies.

In 2009 Toll acquired Logistic Distribution Systems (LDS), a Dubai-based international freight forwarding company.

In 2010 Toll acquired United States freight forwarder Summit Logistics.

In 2010 they acquired WT SeaAir and Genesis Forwarding. The acquisitions added significant scale to the Toll Global Forwarding division in Europe.

In 2011 Toll acquired SAT Albatros (SAT), a Dubai-based provider of sea-air services.

Global Logistics

Toll Global Logistics (TGL)  is a division of the Toll Group.  It provides what it calls "integrated logistics solutions" across the Asia Pacific region.

The division offers a range of transport, warehousing and value-added services.

Fleet
The division operates a fleet of air, sea, rail and road vehicles and vessels. The fleet has more than 19,000 vehicles including courier trucks, prime movers, b-doubles, and trailers; and 13,000 units of containers, ships, vessels and aeroplanes operating across the Asia Pacific region. In Singapore specifically, TGL was reported in 2011 as owning small cargo ships, which ferry container trucks to and from nearby ports in neighbouring Malaysia and Indonesia and a fleet of trucks consisting of about 70 Hino, Fuso and UD prime movers that have roughly seven single trailers for each mover. In Vietnam TGL has over 300 trucks.

Geographic Reach
The division has over 600 facilities in 15 countries and employs about 10,000 people. Its focus is on providing localised supply chain logistics.

In China, Toll can deliver within 48 hours to 70 percent of the cities in Pan-China region. In Taiwan Toll can deliver within 24 hours to 90% of the island-wide points of delivery. In Thailand Toll can deliver to all provinces within 72 hours.

In Indonesia, it has six distribution centres and in Korea the division has three centres. In Vietnam Toll has 15 sites. In Thailand, Toll can reach all provinces within 72 hours and cover over 4,000 drop points. Toll operates more than 20 logistics facilities in mainland China and delivers to over 1,600 cities across China.

Former divisions

 Toll Domestic Forwarding apparently disappeared in a restructuring in 2017.
 Toll Resources & Government Logistics, assumed restructured.

Sponsorships

Motorsport

In 1998, Toll sponsored the establishment of a V8 Supercars team by then CEO Paul Little. Paul Little Racing competed for seven years as a minnow team with Anthony Tratt driving, before the team was closed and Toll began sponsoring front-runners HSV Dealer Team with Rick Kelly and Garth Tander winning the 2006 and 2007 drivers' championships, before moving in 2008 with Tander to the sister Holden Racing Team until the end of the 2013 season.

Other
Toll has been involved in road safety programs. In 2013, Toll Group was announced as a sponsor of the Amy Gillett Foundation, an Australian cycling advocacy group promoting road safety. In 2016, Toll partnered with Driver Reviver, a community program advocating safe driving behaviour by encouraging motorists to take breaks while driving long distances.

References

External links

 
Australian subsidiaries of foreign companies
Companies based in Melbourne
Companies formerly listed on the Australian Securities Exchange
Conglomerate companies of Australia
Logistics companies of Australia
Transport companies established in 1888
Transport companies of Australia
1888 establishments in Australia
1993 initial public offerings